Zombie Apocalypse: Never Die Alone is a downloadable shoot 'em up game published by Konami in 2011 for the PlayStation 3 and Xbox 360. It is a sequel to 2009's Zombie Apocalypse, starring four new heroes.

Gameplay
The player controls one of the four heroes, defending against zombies. Items dropped by survivors can be used. The game emphasizes cooperative play, with squad-based mechanics and resource distribution amongst the players.

Reception

The game received "mixed or average reviews" on both platforms according to the review aggregation website Metacritic.

References

External links
 

2011 video games
Cooperative video games
Konami games
Multiplayer and single-player video games
PlayStation 3 games
PlayStation Network games
Video games about zombies
Video games developed in the United States
Video games featuring female protagonists
Xbox 360 Live Arcade games